ZG, Zg, or zg may refer to:

Arts and entertainment:
 Z-G, a collectible action figure game
 ZOEgirl, a pop rock band
Zubeen Garg, Indian singer and actor, known as ZG.

Places:
 Aspen and Pitkin County, Colorado (former vehicle plate code ZG)
 Zagreb, the capital and the largest city of Croatia
 Zigong, in Sichuan province of China
 Canton of Zug, one of the 26 cantons of Switzerland

Other uses:
 Viva Macau (defunct airline previously using IATA airline code ZG)
 Zeptogram (written zg, with lower case "z"), an SI unit of mass (equal to 10−21 g)
 Zettagram (written Zg, with capital "Z"), an SI unit of mass (equal to 1021 g)
 Zipair Tokyo (IATA airline code ZG)